Briault may refer to:

 Jean-Claude Briault (born 1947), New Caledonian politician
 P. Briault (died 1922), French astronomer
 Briault (crater), an impact crater in the Mare Tyrrhenum quadrangle of Mars